"Shake, Rattle and Roll" is a song, written in 1954 by Jesse Stone (usually credited as Charles Calhoun, his songwriting name). The original recording by Big Joe Turner is ranked number 127 on the Rolling Stone magazine's list of The 500 Greatest Songs of All Time.

Background
In early 1954, Ahmet Ertegun of Atlantic Records suggested to Jesse Stone that he write an up-tempo blues for Big Joe Turner, a blues shouter whose career had begun in Kansas City before World War II. Stone played around with various phrases before coming up with "shake, rattle and roll". (Stone used his real name for ASCAP songs, while using the pseudonym "Charles Calhoun" for BMI-registered songs, such as "Shake, Rattle and Roll").

However, the phrase had been used in earlier songs.  In 1910, vaudeville performer "Baby" Franklin Seals published "You Got to Shake, Rattle and Roll", a ragtime tune about gambling with dice, in New Orleans;  in 1919, Al Bernard recorded a version of the song.

Joe Turner original
Turner recorded "Shake, Rattle and Roll" in New York City on February 15, 1954.  Jesse Stone, and record label executives Jerry Wexler and Ahmet Ertegun provided the shouting chorus; other players included guitarist Mickey Baker and drummer Connie Kay. Turner's recording was released in April 1954 and reached number one on the U.S. Billboard R&B chart and number 22 on the Billboard singles chart.

Bill Haley version

Bill Haley & His Comets recorded a cover version of the song on June 7, 1954, the same week Turner's version first topped the R&B charts. The Comets provided the instrumental accompaniment: Johnny Grande on piano, Billy Williamson on rhythm guitar, Marshall Lytle on bass, and Joey Ambrose on saxophone.  Haley's version was released in August and reached number seven on the Billboard singles chart, spending a total of twenty-seven weeks in the Top 40. In the UK, this version peaked at number four.  This version of the song was played during the credits in the 1985 cult film Clue.

Elvis Presley versions
Elvis Presley recorded the song twice in a studio setting: a demo recorded at radio station KDAV in Lubbock, Texas in January 1955 while under contract with Sun Records (this recording was not released until the 1990s) and as a 1956 single for RCA Victor.

Introduced by Cleveland disc jockey Bill Randle, Presley, guitarist Scotty Moore, bassist Bill Black, and drummer D. J. Fontana performed the song in medley with the similar "Flip, Flop and Fly" on the January 28, 1956, broadcast of the Dorsey Brothers Stage Show (Haley's "kitchen" opening verse was sung). Presley recorded the song with these same musicians.

See also
 First rock and roll record

References

Songs about dancing
Songs about rock music
1954 singles
1954 songs
Big Joe Turner songs
Bill Haley songs
Elvis Presley songs
Songs written by Jesse Stone
Atlantic Records singles
Grammy Hall of Fame Award recipients